Frenaros FC 2000 is a Cypriot football team from the village Frenaros, Famagusta. It was founded in 2000. This season the team participates in Cypriot Third Division.

Achievements
Cypriot Fourth Division Winners: 1
2005

External links
 Official Website 
 CFA Official Website

Football clubs in Cyprus
Association football clubs established in 2000
2000 establishments in Cyprus